The Trois-Rivières Aigles (French: Aigles de Trois-Rivières) are a Canadian professional baseball team based in Trois-Rivières, Quebec. They are members of the Frontier League, and play their home games at Stade Quillorama.

The Aigles are named to honour the previous Trois-Rivières Aigles, which called the same ballpark home from 1971 until 1977 as a member of the Eastern League as an affiliate of the Cincinnati Reds. In addition, a team in the Ligue de Baseball Junior Élite du Québec bore that name, winning the 2007 pennant. The Aigles' mascot is Grand Chelem l'aigle (English: Grand Slam the Eagle).

History
After various attempts to place a franchise in Trois-Rivières (including various exhibition games), the Can-Am League finally announced the Aigles' membership on October 3, 2012.  Notable co-owners include 2003 National League Cy Young Award winner Éric Gagné and Carolina Hurricanes defenceman Marc-André Bergeron.

On November 14, it was announced that Pierre-Luc Laforest would serve as the Aigles' inaugural manager.  Laforest is best known for his time among the Aigles' provincial rivals the Québec Capitales, winning the Can-Am League MVP award in 2009 and serving as player/hitting coach in 2011 and 2012 (Laforest has been a member of all four of the Capitales' four consecutive Can-Am league pennant winners).

In 2015, the Aigles qualified for the playoffs for the first time in the franchise's history. On September 13, 2015, the Aigles defeated the Rockland Boulders in Game 5 by a score of 7-2 and won the opening series 3 games to 2 and advanced to the championship for the first time in franchise history. They played the New Jersey Jackals and defeated them 3 games to 2 to win the 2015 Can-Am League championship, their first in franchise history.

The team joined the Frontier League for the 2020 season when that league absorbed the Can-Am League in a merger. However, due to the COVID-19 pandemic and extended closure of the Canada–United States border, the league announced that the Aigles (along with the Québec Capitales) would be unable to compete for the 2020 season (which was eventually cancelled). The club later announced they intended to organize a separate league in Québec for the summer as an alternative, but these plans were eventually scrapped by both clubs.

In 2021, the Aigles again had their season cancelled due to the ongoing closure of the Canada–U.S. border. Canadian players signed by the Aigles and the Ottawa Titans had the opportunity to join the Québec Capitales (who started the season as a traveling team known as Équipe Québec, playing exclusively in the U.S.), while all other non-Canadian players on the roster were subject to a dispersal draft among the 13 US–based teams.

Current roster

Notable alumni
 Pete Laforest (2013)
 Pedro López (2015)
 Éric Gagné (2015)
 Jerry Gil (2015)
 Andrew Taylor (2015)
 Ryan Bollinger (2014–2016)
 Danny Richar (2016)
 Andrew Chin (2017)
Bubby Rossman (2019)

Season-by-Season records

1: In 2021, Équipe Québec, a combination of the Aigles and the Quebec Capitales, played in the Frontier League.  With a record of 52—44, they finished first in the Atlantic Division, and lost the Division Series to the Washington Wild Things 3-2.

References

External links
 

Sport in Trois-Rivières
Baseball teams in Quebec
Baseball teams established in 2012
Canadian American Association of Professional Baseball teams